Naraina Vihar is a residential locality in South West Delhi. It is composed of flats built by the Delhi Development Authority (DDA) and privately built houses. The neighborhood is connected with Delhi Metro by Naraina Vihar station. 

Naraina Area is divided into industrial, residential, and rural areas. The industrial area has a large focus on steel and electronics. The headquarters of the Steel Authority of India Limited and Border Roads Organisation are also situated in Naraina. 

Naraina Gaon is the rural area. Naraina is adjacent to the western segment of the Ring Road, Delhi between Dhaula Kuan and Rajouri Garden.

Surrounding areas include: Inderpuri, Loha Mandi, IARI or Pusa, Delhi Cantt, Mayapuri, Shadipur Depot, and Patel Nagar.

External links 
 Geo Links for Naraina

Neighbourhoods in Delhi
Cities and towns in South West Delhi district